Dhabbawali Mata Temple (Hindi: ढब्बावाली माता मंदिर) is a famous Hindu temple located in the Jalore district of Rajasthan, India. The idol of Goddess Dhabbawali Mata is installed in it. It is situated at Khasarvi, 35 km north-west of Sanchore. A Goddess Peeth on the revered land of Rajasthan, which is situated on the holy land of village Khasarvi of district Jalore tehsil Sanchore.

Fair and Special 
In this temple of Mataji, a fair is held on the full moon of every month, in which thousands of devotees come to pay their respects at the door of the mother. A special interesting thing related to this is that we cannot take the prasad offered to Mataji out of the Khasarvi area.

See also 

 Jalore district
 Sundha Mata Temple
 Karni Mata Temple
 ढब्बावाली माता मंदिर, खासरवी

References 

Temples of Jalore District
Tourist attractions in Jalore district